Tufele may refer to:

Tufele Liamatua, American Samoan politician
Kapeliele Tufele III, King of Uvea 1950-1953
Mikaele Tufele II, King of Uvea 1928-1931
Tufele I, King of Uvea 1810-1818
Jay Tufele (born 1999), American football player